is a phenomenon in Japanese morphophonology that governs the voicing of the initial consonant of a non-initial portion of a compound or prefixed word. In modern Japanese, rendaku is common but at times unpredictable, with certain words unaffected by it.

While kanji do not indicate rendaku, it is marked in kana with dakuten (voicing mark).

Origin 
Rendaku was initially an automatic and predictable process in Japanese. One theory states that rendaku was originally a way to distinguish compound words from saying a word twice when comparing two words or listing things (compare ひとびと hitobito "people" – with rendaku – versus ひと、ひと hito hito "one person, another person" – without rendaku). Native Japanese words never begin with a voiced obstruent or sibilant (b, d, g, z, etc.) so rendaku was merely an allophonic detail that never caused any misunderstanding. However, after the 4th century, Japan started borrowing words and characters from China, which caused the once regular process of rendaku to become less predictable. Since many Chinese words begin with voiced consonants, applying rendaku to those words would cause ambiguity (compare 試験 shiken "examination" with 事件  jiken "incident"). Therefore, compound words consisting of purely Chinese words tend not to exhibit rendaku while compounds consisting of native Japanese words do exhibit rendaku, with many exceptions.

Examples 

Rendaku can be seen in the following words:
  (iteration)
 hito + hito → hitobito ("person" + "person" → "people")
 
 ike + hana → ikebana ("keep alive" + "flower" → "flower arrangement")
  (iteration, reduplication)
 toki + toki → tokidoki ("time" + "time" → "sometimes")
 
 te + kami → tegami ("hand" + "paper" → "letter")
 
 ori + kami → origami ("fold" + "paper" → "paperfolding")
 
hana + hi → hanabi ("flower" + "fire" → "firework")

 hana + chi → hanaji ("nose" + "blood" → "nosebleed")
 
 maki + sushi → makizushi ("roll" + "sushi" → "nori-wrapped sushi") (Rendaku is prevalent with words that end in sushi.)
 
 yama + tera → Yama-dera ("mountain" + "temple")
 
 kokoro + tsukai → kokorozukai ("heart" + "using" → "consideration" or "thoughtfulness")
 
 oboro + tsuki → oborozuki ("haze" + "moon" → "hazy moon")

In some cases, rendaku varies depending on syntax.

Rendaku occurs not only on single-root elements, but also "multi-root" elements, those that are themselves composed of smaller elements. These morphemes may also be of Chinese origin (see kango) or even of non-Literary-Chinese origin (see gairaigo) rather than strictly native.
 
 hira + kana → hiragana ("plain" + "character", compare  katakana, which does not undergo rendaku)
 
 kyaku + futon → kyakubuton ("guest" + "bedding" → "bedding for guests")
Here, futon is a kango and compound of fu + ton
 
 roten + furo → rotenburo ("outdoor" + "bath" → "outdoor bath")
 
 yumemi + kokochi → yumemigokochi ("dreaming" + "state of mind" → "dream state")
 
 oboro + tsukiyo → oborozukiyo ("haze" + "moonlit night" → "hazy moonlit night")
Here, tsukiyo is a compound word, composed of tsuki ("moon") and yo ("night")
 
 iro + chaya → irojaya ("lust" + "teahouse" → "brothel teahouse")
Here, chaya is a compound word, composed of cha ("tea") and ya ("shop"); cha by itself generally doesn't undergo rendaku, but chaya frequently does
 
 Bon + chōchin → Bonjōchin ("Bon" + "lantern" → "Bon lantern")
Here, chōchin is a Chinese borrowing, composed of chō ("portable") and chin ("lamp")
 
 oya + kaisha → oyagaisha ("parent" + "company" → "parent company")
Here, kaisha is a kango, composed of kai ("gathering") and sha ("company")
 
 kabushiki + kaisha → kabushikigaisha ("stock-type" + "company" → "joint-stock company")
 
 ame + kappa → amagappa ("rain" + "raincoat" → "raincoat")
Here, kappa is a gairaigo, from the Portuguese word capa ("cloak; cape")
 
 iroha + karuta → irohagaruta
Here, karuta is a gairaigo, from the Portuguese word carta ("card")
 
 mizu + kiseru → mizugiseru ("water" + "pipe" → "hooka")
Here, kiseru is a gairaigo, from the Khmer word khsiə ("pipe")

This isn't a hard and fast rule, however, because it's relaxed in certain older compounds or names, especially those that are so consolidated that they could hardly be recognized as compounds anymore, but rather, as single words themselves.

Rendaku occurs not only in compound nouns, but also in compounds with adjectives, verbs or continuative/nominal forms of verbs.
 
 me + fu-ku → mebu-ku ("sprout" + "to blow" → "to bud")
 
 otoko + kira-i → otokogira-i ("male person" + "dislike; hatred" → "dislike for men; misandry")
 
 onna + su-ki → onnazu-ki ("female person" + "liking; fondness" → "fondness for women; woman lover")
 
 o-ki + sa-ri → o-ki-za-ri ("putting" + "leaving" → "deserting")
 
 kuru-i + sa-ki → kuru-i-za-ki ("being in disarray" + "blooming" → "unseasonable blooming")
 
 usu- + kitana-i → usugitana-i ("faint-; light-" + "dirty" → "dirty")
 
 kuchi + kitana-i → kuchigitana-i ("mouth" + "dirty" → "foulmouthed; scurrilous")
 
 ta-chi + toma-ru → ta-chi-doma-ru ("standing; starting; igniting" + "to stop" → "to stop")

Rendaku in Tohoku dialects 
In many Tohoku dialects, rendaku can be expressed in the form of prenasalized voicing. This prenasalized sound production was not uniformed at all, and depending on the speakers and the words pronounced, significant variations were observed.

There was a relationship between the rate of prenasalized voicing and the speakers’ age: older individuals display it at a higher rate than younger individuals. On the other hand, differences in the speakers’ gender and socioeconomic status did not affect the rate of prenasalized voicing.

Examples of allophonic variation 
For example, “[kata] ‘shoulder’ and [haka] ‘tomb’ are pronounced [kada] and [haga]” in Tohoku dialect.

The extensive examples of allophonic variation in the Tohoku dialect are as follows:

Properties blocking rendaku
Research into defining the range of situations affected by rendaku has largely been limited to finding circumstances (outlined below) which cause the phenomenon not to manifest.

Lyman's Law
Lyman's Law states that there can be no more than one voiced obstruent (a consonant sound formed by obstructing airflow) within a morpheme. Therefore, no rendaku can occur if the second element contains a voiced obstruent. This is considered to be one of the most fundamental of the rules governing rendaku.

yama + kado → Yamakado (surname) , not *Yamagado やまがど ("mountain" + "gate" → place name) (* indicates a non-existent form)
hitori + tabi → hitoritabi, not *hitoridabi ("one person" + "travel" → "traveling alone")
yama + kaji → yamakaji, not *yamagaji ("mountain" + "fire" → "mountain fire") 
tsuno + tokage → tsunotokage, not *tsunodokage ("horn" + "lizard" → "horned lizard")

There are, however, exceptions to Lyman's Law. For example, nawa + hashigo is nawabashigo, not nawahashigo. Although this law is named after Benjamin Smith Lyman, who independently propounded it in 1894, it is really a re-discovery. The Edo period linguists Kamo no Mabuchi (1765) and Motoori Norinaga (1767–1798) separately and independently identified the law during the 18th century.

Lexical properties
Similar to Lyman's Law, it has been found that for some lexical items, rendaku does not manifest if there is a voiced obstruent near the morphemic boundary, including preceding the boundary.

Semantics
Rendaku also tends not to manifest in compounds which have the semantic value of "X and Y" (so-called dvandva or copulative compounds):

yama + kawa > yamakawa "mountains and rivers"

Compare this to yama + kawa > yamagawa "mountain river".

Branching constraint
Rendaku is also blocked by what is called a "branching constraint". In a right-branching compound, the process is blocked in the left-branching elements:

mon + (shiro + chō) > monshirochō, not *monjirochō ("family crest" + {"white" + "butterfly"} > "cabbage butterfly")
but
(o + shiro) + washi > ojirowashi ({"tail" + "white"} + "eagle" > "white-tailed eagle")

Further considerations
Despite a number of rules which have been formulated to help explain the distribution of the effect of rendaku, there still remain many examples of words in which rendaku manifests in ways currently unpredictable. Some instances are linked with a lexical property as noted above but others may obey laws yet to be discovered. Rendaku thus remains partially unpredictable, sometimes presenting a problem even to native speakers, particularly in Japanese names, where rendaku occurs or fails to occur often without obvious cause. In many cases, an identically written name may either have or not have rendaku, depending on the person.

Voicing of preceding consonant
This is rare and irregular, however.

See also
Consonant mutation
Lenition
Sandhi

Notes

References

 
 
 

 
 
  Japanese citation: 
 
 
 

Further reading
 . In Jeroen van de Weijer, K. Nanjo and T. Nishihara (eds.) (2005). Voicing in Japanese. Studies in Generative Grammar 84. Mouton de Gruyter, Berlin. 5-24.

External links

 The Japanese Lexicon: A Rendaku Encyclopedia – National Institute for Japanese Language and Linguistics

Japanese phonology
Japanese writing system terms